The Rylands Building is a Grade II listed building and former department store in Market Street, Manchester, England. Situated close to the Piccadilly area of Manchester city centre, the building was originally built as a warehouse by J. Gerrard & Sons of Swinton for the Rylands textile company (Rylands & Sons Ltd) which was founded by John Rylands. That firm had occupied warehouses in High Street ever since 1822. Its west-facing side is on High Street;  The building was designed by the eminent Manchester architects, Fairhursts (Harry S. & P. G. Fairhurst), in an Art Deco style. It is clad in Portland stone and features a decorative corner tower and eclectic 'zig zag' window lintels. The work was completed in 1932.

The building is situated in the Smithfield conservation area of Manchester, an area which was known for its markets and textile warehouses. Following a fire, in 1957, which destroyed the premises of Paulden's Department Store, in All Saints, the company acquired the Rylands warehouse building and converted it to a store. This was then a direct rival to the Lewis's store, on the opposite side of Market Street. In 1973 Debenhams, the owner of Paulden's rebranded the store in their name. It remained Debenhams until its closure in 2021, outlasting other Manchester department stores, including Lewis's, Affleck & Brown and C&A.

The Rylands Building can be seen in the background of L. S. Lowry's 1954 painting, Piccadilly Gardens.

See also

Listed buildings in Manchester-M60

References

Commercial buildings in Manchester
Debenhams
Department store buildings in the United Kingdom
Towers in Greater Manchester
Grade II listed buildings in Manchester
Grade II listed commercial buildings
Art Deco architecture in England